Amore e non amore (Love and non-love) is a concept album by the Italian singer and songwriter Lucio Battisti. It was released in July 1971 by Dischi Ricordi.

The album focuses on the contraposition of "love" and "not-love". As a result, the LP is split in two definite "sides", each one made up of four songs:
 The "non-love" side, characterised by a rock and roll music style and lyrics referring to "non-love" situations (e.g. adultery, unrequited or obsessive love, etc.).
 The "love" side, characterised by instrumental tracks with long titles and a progressive rock music style.

The album was Italy's 10th best selling album in 1971, though no song from this disc became nearly as popular as those included in Battisti's other albums from this period.

Track listing 
All lyrics written by Mogol, all music composed by Lucio Battisti.
 "Dio mio no" (My God, No!) – 7:31
 "Seduto sotto un platano con una margherita in bocca guardando il fiume nero macchiato dalla schiuma bianca dei detersivi" (Sitting under a plane tree with a daisy in the mouth looking at the black river spotted by detersives' white foam) – 3:08
 "Una" (One) – 3:45
 "7 agosto di pomeriggio fra le lamiere roventi di un cimitero di automobili solo io, silenzioso eppure straordinariamente vivo" (August 7 in the afternoon among the scorching sheets of a cars' cemetery [there is] only me, silent yet extraordinarily alive) – 4:02
 "Se la mia pelle vuoi" (If You Want My Skin) – 4:07
 "Davanti ad un distributore automatico di fiori dell'aereoporto di Bruxelles anch'io chiuso in una bolla di vetro" (In front of a flowers vending machine in Bruxelles's airport I [am] closed in a glass bowl too) – 2:15
 "Supermarket" – 4:51
 "Una poltrona, un bicchiere di cognac, un televisore, 35 morti ai confini di Israele e Giordania" (An armchair, a glass of cognac, a television, 35 deaths at the border between Israel and Jordan) – 5:57

Personnel

 Dario Baldan - organ, organo
 Lucio Battisti - arranger, composer, conductor, guitar, keyboards, orchestra director, primary artist, vocals
 Fabio Berruti - artwork, graphic design
 Franz Di Cioccio - drums
 Gary Hobish - reissue mastering
 La Rosa, Antonio - remastering
 Mogol - audio 2 composer
 Francone Mussida - chitarrone, guitar
 Silvio Nobili - cover photo, photography
 Amedeo Pace - liner notes
 Walter Patergnani - engineer
 Giorgio Piazza - bass
 Flavio Premoli - percussion, piano, tambourine, tamburello
 Alberto Radius - chitarrone, guitar
 Nathaniel Russell - reissue art director, reissue layout
 Filippo Salvadori - reissue producer

References

1971 albums
Progressive rock albums by Italian artists
Concept albums
Lucio Battisti albums